Argentine actress and singer Lali Espósito has featured in forty-two music videos, seven films, eleven television series, six web series and multiple commercials. She has also directed the trailer for a TV series and two of her videoclips. She achieved early fame when she appeared in the Telefe television series Casi Ángeles. From 2007 to 2012, Espósito was part of the teen band Teen Angels, alongside Peter Lanzani, María Eugenia Suárez, Gastón Dalmau, Nicolás Riera and Rocío Igarzábal.

Espósito first television appearance was in Rincón de Luz in 2003 as Malena Coco Cabrera. Through 2004 and 2005, Espósito portrayed Roberta Espinosa in the Argentine telenovela Floricienta. In 2006, the actress portrayed Agustina Ross in Chiquitias Sin Fin, a spin off of the original Chiquititas (1995). From 2007 to 2010 she appeared in the Telefe television series Casi Ángeles by portraying Marianella Rinaldi. Across the duration of the telenovela, there were released the music videos for Espósito's solos "Escaparé" and "Hay Un Lugar" directed by Mariano De María.

In 2011, the singer starred in the Argentine comedy series Cuando Me Sonreís as Milagros Rivas. In 2012 the actress made a cameo appearance as Ana in the telenovela Dulce Amor and also starred in the Argentine comedy film La Pelea de mi Vida as Belén. Espósito portrayed Daniela Costeau in the Argentine series Solamente Vos across 2013, and also appeared in the film Teen Angels: El Adiós which is a live show and documentary about the band's last show before their breaking and in which she starred as herself. The same year, she launched her solo career and released his solo debut single "A Bailar", the music video for which was directed by Juan Ripari. In 2014, Espósito portrayed Melissa in the Peruvian comedy A Los 40 and also released the music videos for "Asesina" and "No Estoy Sola", both directed by Juan Ripari.

In 2015, Espósito portrayed her first lead role in television as Julia Esperanza Albarracín in the Argentine series Esperanza mía alongside Mariano Martínez. Across that year, Espósito released the music videos for "Mil Años Luz", "Del Otro Lado" and "Histeria", also directed by Juan Ripari, and also for "Necesito", which was directed by Sebastian Pivotto. In 2016, the actress made a cameo appearance in the film Me Casé con un Boludo as herself and starred as Camila in the comedy film That's Not Cheating alongside Martín Piroyansky. The same year, Espósito released the lyric video for "Unico" and the music videos for "Soy", "Boomerang", "Mueve" and "Ego" in which she appeared.

Music videos

Guest appearances

Filmography

Cameo appearances

Television

Reality competitions and specials

Other

Live performances

Performances at award shows

Performances at television shows and specials

Direction

Web

Commercials

Footnotes

References

External links 
Lali's official Vevo channel on YouTube

Videography
Videographies
Actress filmographies